SK-1 is an initialism of "Skafandr Kosmicheskiy" # 1 (Скафандр Космический = "diving suit for space") is a spacesuit that was developed specially for Yuri Gagarin. As such, it is the first spacesuit ever used. After his successful flight on the Vostok 1 spacecraft, spacesuits of the SK series were used for space flights of other cosmonauts on Vostok spacecraft, in which the cosmonauts would eject and land separately from module.

The SK-1 was used from 1961-1963.

SK-2 (CK-2)
Almost exactly the same as the SK-1 but designed for a woman, it was on June 16 through 19th in 1963 on Vostok 6.

Specifications 

Name: SK-1/SK-2 Spacesuit
Manufacturer: NPP Zvezda
Missions: Vostok 1 to Vostok 6
Function: Intra-vehicular activity (IVA) and Ejection
Operating Pressure: 
Suit Weight: 
Primary Life Support: Vehicle Provided

References

 
 Astronautix Sokol SK-1

External links
Vita Germetika : A Brief History of Creating and Development  of Soviet-Russian space suits - in Russian
Museum of NPP Zvezda : photo of SK#1 space suit
Memorial Museum of Cosmonautics in Moscow SK-1 Suit Picture (34 & 35)
Zvezda History(Russian) Eng

Soviet and Russian spacesuits
Vostok program